Phuket Andaman Football Club (Thai สโมสรฟุตบอลภูเก็ต อันดามัน), is a Thai professional football club based in Phuket. The club is currently playing in the Thai League 3 Southern region.

History
In 2009, the club is formed as Phuket Football Club, nicknamed The  Southern Sea Kirins, and admitted to the Regional League South Division. Club home games to be played at Surakul Stadium. Sirirak Konthong named as the first ever coach of Phuket. In 2010 Phuket won the Southern Regional Division 2 and finished 2nd in the Division 2 Champions League after losing to Buriram FC in the final anyway the club promoted to Division 1.

In 2017, Phuket F.C. decided to dissolve the club due to financial problems about unfair contract cancellation.

In 2018, Phuket F.C. collapsed and combined with Phuket City.

Honours

Domestic leagues
Regional League Division 2
 Runners-up (1) : 2010
Regional League South Division
 Winners (1) : 2010

Stadium and locations

Seasons

P = Played
W = Games won
D = Games drawn
L = Games lost
F = Goals for
A = Goals against
Pts = Points
Pos = Final position

TPL = Thai Premier League

QR1 = First Qualifying Round
QR2 = Second Qualifying Round
QR3 = Third Qualifying Round
QR4 = Fourth Qualifying Round
RInt = Intermediate Round
R1 = Round 1
R2 = Round 2
R3 = Round 3

R4 = Round 4
R5 = Round 5
R6 = Round 6
GR = Group Stage
QF = Quarter-finals
SF = Semi-finals
RU = Runners-up
S = Shared
W = Winners

Coaches

References

 http://phuketfootballclub.com/news/%E0%B9%82%E0%B8%A3%E0%B8%99%E0%B8%B4%E0%B8%99%E0%B9%80%E0%B8%9B%E0%B8%B4%E0%B8%94%E0%B8%95%E0%B8%B1%E0%B8%A7%E0%B8%A2%E0%B8%B4%E0%B9%88%E0%B8%87%E0%B9%83%E0%B8%AB%E0%B8%8D%E0%B9%88-%E0%B8%9E%E0%B8%A3/
 http://www.siamsport.co.th/football/thaileague3/view/41767
 http://www.thailive.net/2017/12/17/official-%E0%B8%A0%E0%B8%B9%E0%B9%80%E0%B8%81%E0%B9%87%E0%B8%95-%E0%B8%8B%E0%B8%B4%E0%B8%95%E0%B8%B5%E0%B9%89%E0%B8%95%E0%B8%B1%E0%B9%89%E0%B8%87-%E0%B9%82%E0%B8%84%E0%B9%89%E0%B8%8A/

External links 
 Official Website

 
Defunct football clubs in Thailand
Football clubs in Thailand
Association football clubs established in 2009
Association football clubs disestablished in 2017
Phuket province
2009 establishments in Thailand
2017 disestablishments in Thailand